Herwer was an ancient Egyptian town in the 16th nome (Oryx nome) in Upper Egypt. It is mentioned in several ancient inscriptions dating from the Old, Middle and New Kingdom. The main deities of the place were Khnum and Heqet, both several times called lord or lady of Herwer. Perhaps in the Middle Kingdom, the place became capital of the 16th Upper Egyptian nome. The local governor Amenemhat of that nome was indeed overseer of the priests of Khnum of Herwer. The place is often mentioned in the tombs of Beni Hasan.

The localisation of Herwer remains problematic. Yet however in the Onomasticon of Amenope and in the Turin Papyrus 118.11, Herwer is referred to as north of Hermopolis, which excludes an identification with Antinoöpolis.

See also
 List of ancient Egyptian towns and cities

References 

Cities in ancient Egypt
Former populated places in Egypt